Cabot Bigham (born October 7, 1996) is an American racing driver. He last competed in Nitro Rallycross with Dreyer & Reinbold Racing. In 2016, he won the Global Rallycross championship in the Lites class.

Racing record

Career summary

Motorsports career results

Complete Global RallyCross results

Lites

Supercar

Complete Americas RallyCross results

ARX2

Supercar

Complete Nitro RallyCross results

Supercar

Personal life 
Bigham currently lives in Reno, Nevada. He graduated from the College of Marin with a degree in business administration. Additionally, he started a clothing line called Oink Brand, named after his nickname, "The Big Ham".

References

1996 births
Living people
Global RallyCross Championship drivers
Bryan Herta Autosport drivers
Dreyer & Reinbold Racing drivers
Andretti Autosport drivers
Michelin Pilot Challenge drivers